John J. McArdle is Professor of Psychology and Gerontology at the University of Southern California (USC), where he is also director of the Unified Studies of Cognition (CogUSC) Lab. He is known for his work on quantitative research methodology and on the changes in cognitive function and personality that occur as individuals age.

Education and career
McArdle received his B.A. from Franklin & Marshall College in 1973 and his M.A. and Ph.D. from Hofstra University in 1975 and 1977, respectively. He then began postdoctoral work at the University of Denver with John L. Horn. In 1984, he joined the faculty of the University of Virginia to begin a quantitative methods program. In 2005, he joined the faculty of USC, where he started another quantitative research program. He is now a professor of psychology and gerontology at USC, the head of their Quantitative Methods training program, the director of their CogUSC lab, and a co-principal investigator of the Health and Retirement Study.

Professional affiliations
McArdle was president of the Society of Multivariate Experimental Psychology from 1992 to 1993, and of the Federation of Behavioral, Psychological & Cognitive Sciences from 1996 to 1999. In 2012, he was elected as a fellow of the American Association for the Advancement of Science.

Select publications

Books

Research papers
McArdle, J. J., Ferrer-Caja, E., Hamagami, F., & Woodcock, R. W. (2002). Comparative longitudinal structural analyses of the growth and decline of multiple intellectual abilities over the life span. Developmental Psychology, 38(1), 115–142. 
McArdle, J. J. (2009). Latent variable modeling of differences and changes with longitudinal data. Annual review of psychology, 60, 577–605.

Editing and contributed book chapters
McArdle, J. J., & Nesselroade, J. R. (2003). Growth curve analysis in contemporary psychological research. In J. A. Schinka & W. F. Velicer (Eds.), Handbook of psychology: Research methods in psychology, Vol. 2, pp. 447–480). John Wiley & Sons Inc.

References

External links
Faculty page

Living people
21st-century American psychologists
University of Southern California faculty
Hofstra University alumni
Franklin & Marshall College alumni
American gerontologists
University of Virginia faculty
Fellows of the American Association for the Advancement of Science
Year of birth missing (living people)